This is a list of the extreme coordinates of Mexico, the points that are farther north, south, east or west than any other location.
Easternmost point: 86° 42' 36" W longitude, southeast tip of Isla Mujeres, Quintana Roo.
Westernmost point: 118° 22' 00" W longitude, Roca Elefante at Isla de Guadalupe, in the Pacific Ocean.
Northernmost point: 32° 43' 06" N latitude Monumento 206, near Los Algodones, Baja California, at the United States border.
Southernmost point: 14° 32' 27" N latitude, mouth of Suchiate River, border with Guatemala, in Suchiate, Chiapas.

Elevation
 Highest elevation point: Pico de Orizaba; (Volcán Citlaltépetl) 5,636 m (18,490 feet) 
 Lowest elevation point: Laguna Salada, Baja California at -10 m (-33 feet)

Transportation
 Northernmost airport: General Rodolfo Sánchez Taboada International Airport in Mexicali Municipality, Baja California 
 Southernmost airport: Tapachula International Airport in Tapachula Municipality, Chiapas

See also
Geography of Mexico
Extreme points of the Earth
Extreme points of the Americas
Extreme points of North America
Extreme points of Canada
Extreme points of Canadian provinces
Extreme communities of Canada
Extreme points of Greenland
Extreme points of Mexico
Extreme points of the United States
Extreme points of U.S. states
Extreme points of Massachusetts
Extreme Points of Texas
Extreme points of New England
Extreme points of Central America
Extreme points of the Caribbean
Extreme points of Cuba
Extreme points of South America

Notes

References

External links

INEGI including a map of these coordinates (Spanish).

Mexico
Geography of Mexico
Extreme